Labrie is a surname. Notable people with the surname include:

Brennan LaBrie (born 1999), American journalist
Christine Labrie, Canadian politician
Daniel Labrie, Canadian ice sledge hockey player
Fernand Labrie (1937–2019), Canadian medical researcher
Guy Labrie (1920–1974), Canadian hockey player
Hubert Labrie (born 1991), Canadian hockey player
Jacques Labrie (1784–1831), Canadian politician
James LaBrie (born 1963), Canadian vocalist
Pierre Labrie (born 1972), Canadian poet
Pierre-Cédric Labrie (born 1986), Canadian hockey player
Richard LaBrie, American clinical psychologist and Emmy-nominated editor, director, producer, and writer
Shannon LaBrie, American singer, songwriter, guitarist, and pianist
Vincent Labrie (born 1983), Canadian speed skater